Castellania Coppi is a comune (municipality) in the Province of Alessandria in the Italian region Piedmont, located about  southeast of Turin and about  southeast of Alessandria.   It was known until 2019 as Castellania, and renamed by the Piemont regional council in recognition of the cyclist Fausto Coppi in preparation for the centenary of his birth. 

Castellania Coppi borders the following municipalities: Avolasca, Carezzano, Costa Vescovato, Garbagna, Sant'Agata Fossili, and Sardigliano.

People
Castellania Coppi is known as the birthplace of, and was renamed in honour of, two famous racing cyclists: Angelo Fausto Coppi (1919–1960) and his brother Serse Coppi (1923–1951).

References

Cities and towns in Piedmont